Kamadhenu Mandir is located in Khurkot village of Kushma municipality, Parbat. It is called in western region of Nepal in Dhawalagiri Zone.

This is a temple of Lord Radha Krishna of Hindu religion. It was made in 2053 BS (1996). There is large stone bearing the clear signs of hoofs of cow and In the northern part of the village there lied KOTA- Durga temple. Including these two symbols, people called it as Khurkot.
It is believed that the signs of hoofs of cow in the stone is of Kamadhenu Cow god .

References

Hindu temples in Gandaki Province
1996 establishments in Nepal
Buildings and structures in Parbat District